This Is America, Charlie Brown is an eight-part animated television miniseries that depicts a series of events in American history featuring characters from the Charles M. Schulz comic strip Peanuts. It aired from 1988 to 1989 on CBS. The first four episodes aired as a weekly series in October and November 1988; the final four episodes aired monthly from February to May 1989.

Due to the nature of the events portrayed and the historical figures included — such as the Wright Brothers and George Washington — the opposite of most Charlie Brown cartoons, many adults were shown in full view along with the Peanuts gang, something that happened rarely in the animated films and specials and in only one early sequence in the comic strip. These adults were drawn in a style similar to It's Only a Game, another comic strip by Schulz that featured adults, as well other productions that were overseen by Peanuts regular Bill Melendez.

While all eight episodes were subsequently rerun by CBS in the summer of 1990, the series as a whole subsequently aired in the U.S. on Disney Channel between 1993 and 1997, which gave way to Nickelodeon between 1998 and 2003. However, "The Mayflower Voyagers" episode returned to television in 2008 (and aired each year through 2019, after which the Peanuts television specials migrated over to the Apple TV+ streaming platform) as companion material to pad the 1973 special A Charlie Brown Thanksgiving to a full one-hour time slot. To accommodate the slot, portions of the episode were abridged.

Music
The series included music by many composers and performers including Peanuts regular Ed Bogas, Dave Brubeck, David Benoit (who would later take over scoring the specials starting with It's Christmastime Again, Charlie Brown), George Winston, Wynton Marsalis and Dave Grusin. This continued a tradition of using jazz musicians for the musical score; original composer Vince Guaraldi had died in 1976, though several of his music scores were reused, notably his signature tune, "Linus and Lucy". This miniseries featured The Winans, Desirée Goyette, and Lou Rawls as the singing vocals (Goyette and Rawls had previously worked with Melendez on the Garfield TV specials).

Cast

Regular voice actors
Erin Chase: Charlie Brown (first female actress to voice Charlie Brown)
Erica Gayle: Lucy van Pelt
Brittany M. Thornton: Sally Brown
Brandon Stewart: Linus van Pelt
Jason Mendelson: Peppermint Patty
Marie Cole: Marcie
Curtis Andersen: Schroeder
Hakeem Abdul-Samad: Franklin
Bill Melendez: Snoopy and Woodstock

Occasional voice actors
Jason Riffle: Charlie Brown (in The Birth of The Constitution)
Jeremy Miller: Linus van Pelt (in The Birth of The Constitution)
Ami Foster: Lucy van Pelt (in The Birth of The Constitution)
Christina Lange: Sally Brown (in The Birth of The Constitution)
Keri Houlihan: Marcie (in The Birth of The Constitution)
Tani Taylor Powers: Marcie (in The Mayflower Voyagers and The Wright Brothers at Kitty Hawk)
Cameron Clarke: Snoopy (in The Music and Heroes of America)
Sean Mendelson: Pilgrim Boy (in The Mayflower Voyagers)
Grant Gelt: Franklin (in The NASA Space Station)

Pig-Pen, Violet, and other characters appear a few times but are silent.

Additional voice actors
Frank Welker - Captain Smith (in The Mayflower Voyagers), Pilgrim Explorer 2 (in The Mayflower Voyagers), Squanto (in The Mayflower Voyagers), George Mason (in The Birth of The Constitution), Gouverneur Morris (in The Birth of The Constitution), Wilbur Wright (in The Wright Brothers at Kitty Hawk), Jason Welker (in The NASA Space Station), Alexander Graham Bell (in The Great Inventors), Thomas Edison (in The Great Inventors), Abraham Lincoln (in The Smithsonian and the Presidency), Theodore Roosevelt (in The Smithsonian and the Presidency)
Gregg Berger - Pilgrim Leader (in The Mayflower Voyagers), Myles Standish (in The Mayflower Voyagers), Pilgrim Explorers (in The Mayflower Voyagers), Orville Wright (in The Wright Brothers at Kitty Hawk), NASA Mission Control (in The NASA Space Station), Thomas Watson (in The Great Inventors), Samuel (in The Smithsonian and the Presidency)
Chris Collins as Mayflower Watchman (in The Mayflower Voyagers), Samoset (in The Mayflower Voyagers)
Hal Smith as George Washington (in The Birth of the Constitution), James Wilson (in The Birth of The Constitution), Benjamin Franklin (in The Birth of the Constitution), John Muir (in The Smithsonian and the Presidency)
Julie Payne - Mrs. Holiday (in The Great Inventors)
Bud Davis
Chuck Olson
Shep Menken
Brandon Horne
Marie Wise
Alissa King

Episodes

Home media
The eight episodes, originally released individually on videocassette, were released in a two-DVD collector's set on March 28, 2006, by Paramount Home Entertainment. However, the DVD set went out of print once Warner Bros. purchased the rights to all Peanuts television specials. Warner Home Video has since reissued the miniseries on DVD as of June 17, 2014. It was also released on the digital format.

References

External links

This is America, Charlie Brown from Kim Cartoon

1988 American television series debuts
1989 American television series endings
1980s American animated television series
1980s American television miniseries
American animated television spin-offs
American children's animated comedy television series
American children's animated education television series
Animated television series about children
Animation based on real people
Works based on Peanuts (comic strip)
CBS original programming
English-language television shows
Historical television series
Television series about the history of the United States
Television series by DHX Media
Television series by Warner Bros. Television Studios
Fiction set in 1620
Fiction set in 1787
Fiction set in 1869
Fiction set in 1903
Television series set in the 17th century
Television series set in the 1780s
Television series set in the 1860s
Television series set in the 1900s
Cultural depictions of the Wright brothers
Cultural depictions of George Washington
Cultural depictions of Abraham Lincoln
Cultural depictions of Theodore Roosevelt